Cook Representative, also known as National Chef Team, is a 2016 South Korean cooking-variety program starring Kim Sung-joo, Ahn Jung-hwan, Kang Ho-dong, Choi Hyun-seok, Sam Kim, Lee Won-il and, Lee Yeon-bok, is the spin-off of Please Take Care of My Refrigerator. It aired on JTBC during Wednesdays at 22:50 (KST) beginning February 17, 2016. The series aired its last episode August 10, 2016 after concluding the finals match of the World Championship.

Cast

Hosts
 Kim Sung-joo
 Ahn Jung-hwan
 Kang Ho-dong
 Henry Lau

Chefs
 Choi Hyun-seok
 Sam Kim 
 Lee Won-il
 Lee Yeon-bok
 Oh Se-deuk 
 Jung Ho-young 
 Choi Hyung-jin 
 Lee Chan-oh 
 Yoo Hyun-soo

Culinary Judges
 Chef Wayne Golding
 Ralf Dohmeier
 Stefano Di Salvo
 Nikolaos Kordonias
 David Mitford

Episodes

References

External links
 

2016 South Korean television series debuts
Korean-language television shows
JTBC original programming
South Korean variety television shows
South Korean cooking television series
Television spin-offs
2016 South Korean television series endings